Ruairi Quinn (born 2 April 1946) is an Irish former Labour Party politician who served as Minister for Education and Skills from 2011 to 2014, Leader of the Labour Party from 1997 to 2002, Deputy Leader of the Labour Party from 1989 to 1997, Minister for Finance from 1994 to 1997, Minister for Enterprise and Employment from 1993 to 1994, Minister for the Public Service from 1986 to 1987, Minister for Labour from 1983 to 1986, Minister of State for Urban Affairs and Housing from 1982 to 1983. He served as a Teachta Dála (TD) for the Dublin South-East constituency from 1977 to 1981 and 1982 to 2016. He was a Senator from 1976 to 1977, after being nominated by the Taoiseach and again from 1981 to 1982 for the Industrial and Commercial Panel.

Early life
Quinn was born on 2 April 1946. His family were prominent republicans in County Down in the south-east of Ulster in the 1920s, taking an active part in the IRA during the War of Independence and on the anti-Treaty side during the Civil War. The Quinns were prosperous merchants in Newry, County Down, then moved to Dublin in the 1930s, where Quinn's father built a successful business career.

Quinn was educated at St. Michael's College and Blackrock College, both in Dublin, where he was academically successful and an outstanding athlete and a member of Blackrock College's Senior Cup rugby team. From an early age, he was interested in art and won the all-Ireland Texaco Children's Art competition. This led him to study architecture at University College, Dublin (UCD), in 1964 and later at the School of Ekistics in Athens.

In 1965, Quinn joined the Labour Party working for Michael O'Leary's successful campaign in Dublin North-Central. In the following years, Quinn was a leading student radical in UCD demanding reform of the University's structures and the old fashioned architectural course that then prevailed. This earned him the nickname "Ho Chi Quinn", after the Vietnamese leader Ho Chi Minh.

He travelled in Europe and became a europhile, which was to be a defining characteristic of his political career. He qualified as an architect in 1969 and married for the first time that year before embarking on studies in Athens. He and his first wife had a son and a daughter. He married again in 1990 and has a son with his second wife, the architect Liz Allman, whose family came from Milltown, County Kerry. He became employed as an architect with Dublin Corporation in 1971.

In 1972, Quinn decided he would stand for the Labour Party in the next general election and hoped he would be the running mate of the sitting Labour deputy for Dublin South-East, Noël Browne. The party organisation was largely moribund since Browne's election in 1969 as Browne had been ill and little work had been done locally. When the election was called in February 1973, Quinn found he was the only Labour Party candidate as Browne refused to stand in principled opposition to the Labour Party's decision to enter into a pre-election pact with Fine Gael to form a National Coalition. Quinn lost by 39 votes to Fergus O'Brien of Fine Gael in the final count. Following the 1973 election, Quinn began to rebuild the Labour Party in Dublin South-East with his mainly youthful supporters. He won a council seat on Dublin Corporation at the local elections in 1974 in the Pembroke-Rathmines local electoral area and took a leading role in the Labour Party group on the city council.

He was a partner in an architecture firm from 1973 to 1982. In 1976, he was nominated by the Taoiseach, Liam Cosgrave, to Seanad Éireann when Brendan Halligan won a by-election in Dublin South-West and his Senate seat became vacant. He was first elected a Labour Party TD for Dublin South-East at the 1977 general election. Quinn was at this time quite associated with environmental issues being the first professional architect and town planner ever elected to the Dáil. He served as environment spokesperson for the Labour Party and was very close to the party leader, Frank Cluskey, whom he had voted for in the leadership contest of 1977. He lost his seat at the 1981 general election and was elected to the 15th Seanad on the Industrial and Commercial Panel.  He was re-elected as TD at the February 1982 general election and has retained his seat until his retirement in 2016.

On 10 March 1991, Quinn was observed by Gardaí driving erratically in the Clontarf area. At Clontarf Garda Station, Quinn provided a urine sample, which showed him to have an 202 mg of alcohol for 100 ml of urine. He was banned from driving for a year and fined £250.

Early ministerial career
In 1982, he became Minister of State at the Department of the Environment. Between 1983 and 1987, he served as Minister for Labour. From 1986 to 1987, he was appointed Minister for the Public Service, held in addition to the Labour portfolio. He resigned as a minister when Labour left the government in January 1987. In 1989, he became deputy leader of the Labour Party. He was director of elections for Mary Robinson's successful presidential election campaign in 1990.

Minister for Enterprise and Employment
In the Fianna Fáil–Labour Party coalition government of 1993–1994, Quinn became Minister for Enterprise and Employment.

He oversaw the merger of the former Department of Industry and Commerce with the former Department of Labour, with a new focus on enterprise development and the reduction of the then high level of unemployment. Quinn implemented reform of industrial strategy and reorganised the industrial development agencies. He also introduced the Community Employment Programme to provide activity and involvement for unemployed workers in 1994. This proved to be particularly successful.

Quinn was seen as a moderniser in economic terms but, despite attempts, failed to close the Irish Steel company in Haulbowline, County Cork. Nevertheless, it was in August 1994, while Quinn and Fianna Fáil's Bertie Ahern were economic ministers, that the Irish economy was first described as the "Celtic Tiger".

Quinn, along with many of his Labour cabinet colleagues, strove unsuccessfully to keep the Fianna Fáil–Labour government together during the Father Brendan Smyth crisis in November 1994. He records in his autobiography that he still cannot understand why that Government fell.

Minister for Finance
The following year he became Minister for Finance in the Fine Gael, Labour Party and Democratic Left "Rainbow Coalition" government. Quinn took a relatively conservative line as Finance Minister, being conscious of his position as the first Labour Party Minister for Finance in Irish political history. He quickly proved his competence, dispelling opposition jibes and stock market fears about a social democratic minister holding the sensitive finance portfolio. The Irish economy continued to perform, while inflation and the government finances were kept under firm control. Unemployment gradually fell and public debt levels improved.

During Quinn's tenure as Minister for Finance, the overall tax burden in Ireland (the ratio of tax revenue, including pay related social insurance levies, to gross national product) fell from 38.7% to 34.8%, of by 1.3 percentage points each year. He achieved this by limiting current government spending to grow by 6.8% in nominal terms or 4.8% in real terms, against a backdrop of improving economic fortunes, due to increasing investment in technology intensive sectors of the Irish economy.

Under Quinn, the General Government Balance went from a deficit of 2.1% in 1995 to a surplus of 1.1% in 1997. The General Government Debt went from 81% of GNP in 1995 to 63.6% in 1997. The year before Quinn became an economic Minister in 1993, Irish economic growth was 2.5% (1992). In 1993, GNP growth was 3%; in 1994, 6.5%; in 1995, 8%; in 1996, 7.8%; and finally in 1997, 10.3%. The unemployment rate fell from 15.7% in 1993 to 10.3% in 1997.

Quinn served as the President of the Ecofin Council of the European Union in 1996, and worked to accelerate the launch of the European Single Currency, while securing Ireland's qualification for the eurozone. Quinn, and his party leader and Tánaiste, Foreign Minister Dick Spring enjoyed a somewhat uneasy relationship during the Rainbow Coalition, as recounted in Quinn's 2005 memoir. At the 1997 general election the Labour Party returned to opposition, winning only 17 of its outgoing 33 seats. Many other ministers of the Labour Party were under significant pressure from the media (particularly the Irish Independent) concerning allegations of cronyism ("jobs for the boys") and abusing the privileges of office. In comparison, the opposition under Bertie Ahern placed heavy reliance on cutting tax rates as opposed to widening tax bands favoured by Quinn. Ahern also claimed credit for the country's improving economy was due to his earlier term in government.

Leader of the Labour Party

Accession to leadership
In October 1997, Dick Spring resigned as leader of the Labour Party following an unsuccessful campaign by the Labour Party candidate, Adi Roche, in the 1997 Irish presidential election. Quinn defeated Brendan Howlin to become the new leader. In 1999, the Labour Party and Democratic Left merged. Proinsias De Rossa of the latter party became the largely symbolic party president, while Quinn remained as leader of the party. He used the years of leadership to develop a strong policy platform, publishing a Spatial Strategy for future development of the country, promoting universal access to health insurance, advocating reform of the Garda Síochána, and arguing for closer European integration. Fianna Fáil countered by exploiting Quinn's middle-class background, labelling him "Mr Angry from Sandymount," the middle-class district of Dublin where Quinn is a longtime resident, and was part of the constituency he represented.

2002 general election
At the 2002 general election, which saw the ruling Fianna Fáil and Progressive Democrats government re-elected, the Labour Party returned with no net gain since the previous election, after accounting for the merger with Democratic Left. Quinn fought that election on an independent platform although he indicated a preference to enter government with Fine Gael, which he had served with in the Rainbow coalition era. Quinn's strategy was predicated on the Labour Party holding the balance of power and keeping a distance from the two bigger parties. This underestimated the attraction for the electorate of the outgoing Ahern Government that had enjoyed extraordinary economic growth and prosperity.

Realising that the choice was between a majority Fianna Fáil government on the one hand, or a government of Fianna Fáil in coalition with the Progressive Democrats, through their president, Michael McDowell, a constituency rival of Quinn's, seized the moment and put themselves forward as the guarantor of the public interest in a new Fianna Fáil government. This left the Labour Party stranded and almost as irrelevant to the outcome of the election. Under the leadership of Michael Noonan, Fine Gael lost 23 seats, being reduced to 31 seats, their worst performance in decades.

Quinn was gravely disappointed that, even though Labour had not lost seats in net numbers and Fine Gael had lost 23 seats, he had failed to increase the number of seats his party held, in an election that resulted in gains for small parties on the left end of the political spectrum, such as Sinn Féin and the Green Party. Quinn himself was re-elected on the last count by 600 votes. Accepting that he would now be in opposition for another term, and seeking to spend more time with his young family, Quinn announced that he would not seek re-election for another six-year term as leader of the Labour Party, at the end of August 2002.

Post-leadership
In October 2002, Quinn's term as party leader expired and he retired as Labour leader, being replaced in a leadership election by Pat Rabbitte. When Rabbitte resigned as party leader in 2007, Quinn supported the successful candidacy of Eamon Gilmore. His public support of Gilmore, where he also brought the endorsement of all the Dublin City Councillors in his area, was seen as instrumental in discouraging other candidates from entering the race. Quinn caused anger and controversy when he refused to give up his ministers pension worth €41,656 while sitting as a TD in 2009. He eventually backed down after pressure was put on him to give up the pension.

He led the European Movement Ireland, a pro-EU lobby group in Ireland until late 2007, when he re-founded the Irish Alliance for Europe to campaign on the Treaty of Lisbon. Quinn is also Vice-President and Treasurer of the Party of European Socialists. He is a brother of Lochlann Quinn, former Chairman of Allied Irish Banks, and a first cousin of Senator Feargal Quinn. His nephew, Oisín Quinn, was a Labour Party Dublin City Councillor between 2004 and 2014, and a one-time Dáil candidate in 2007.

In 2005, his political memoir, Straight Left, was published.

2007 general election
At the 2007 general election, Quinn increased his share of the poll by some 4% and was returned to the 30th Dáil. He was nominated for the post of Ceann Comhairle but was defeated by John O'Donoghue. Quinn became Labour Party spokesperson on Education and Science as a member of Eamon Gilmore's front bench in September 2007. He played a pivotal role in the successful second referendum on the Lisbon Treaty in September 2009, and continues to be an office holder with the Party of European Socialists.

2011 general election
In September 2010, Quinn was appointed the Labour Party's national director of elections for the 2011 general election by Gilmore. He had been selected along with Kevin Humphreys to be a candidate for Labour in that election. Both Quinn and Humphreys were elected to the 31st Dáil on 27 February 2011, by clever vote management that saw the Labour Party in Dublin South-East secure two seats with only a quarter of the first preference vote.

Minister for Education: 2011–2014
On 9 March 2011, Quinn was appointed as Minister for Education and Skills in the new Fine Gael–Labour coalition government. In May 2011, he confirmed a U-turn on a pre-election pledge that he would reverse a proposed increase in third level student registration fees, instead providing for a €500 increase in the fee payable by students. In July 2011, Quinn had again refused to rule out the return of college fees as he acknowledged the funding crisis in the higher education sector. The Minister told a meeting of the Higher Education Authority (HEA) the funding crisis in higher education will “not go away” for many years to come. Asked if new charges were planned he said: “I honestly can't say. We are looking for efficiencies in the system at third level. ... I have said to Brendan Howlin that I will deliver.”

In October 2012, Quinn announced the phasing out of the current Junior Certificate programme over the next eight years, to be replaced by a school-based model of continuous assessment. He described his plan as "the most radical shake-up of the junior cycle programme since the ending of the Inter Cert in 1991", and claimed the scrapping of the Junior Certificate exams would help the “bottom half” of students.

On 12 October 2012, Quinn, speaking to an audience at an anniversary celebration for St Kilian's German school, said the “demons of nationalism” and “chauvinism” embedded in our cultures would only stay under control if there was a deeper European culture. The private school, in Clonskeagh, Dublin, celebrated its 60th anniversary, having been founded after the second World War to cater for child refugees from Germany. Between 1945 and 1946, Operation Shamrock, initiated by the Irish Red Cross, resettled over 400 children from postwar Germany, as well as from Austria, France, and United Kingdom. Many of the children, some as young as three years old, had lost their parents in the war, while others had their homes destroyed. He went on to say “will only stay in the place where they belong if we have more Europe, if we have a deeper Europe, if we have a wider Europe”.

On 29 January 2013, Quinn launched Ireland's first national plan to tackle bullying in schools including cyberbullying. The Action Plan on Bullying set out 12 clear actions on how to prevent and tackle bullying.

In February 2013, Quinn published legislation to replace the largely discredited state training and employment agency, FÁS, with a new statutory body named SOLAS.

On 2 July 2014, Ruairi Quinn announced his decision to resign as Minister for Education and Skills, which became effective in the cabinet reshuffle on 11 July. He also said that he would not be seeking re-election to the Dáil after the next general election.

See also
Families in the Oireachtas

Bibliography

References

External links

Ruairi Quinn's page on the Labour Party website

1946 births
Living people
Alumni of University College Dublin
Labour Party (Ireland) TDs
Leaders of the Labour Party (Ireland)
Local councillors in Dublin (city)
Members of the 13th Seanad
Members of the 15th Seanad
Members of the 21st Dáil
Members of the 23rd Dáil
Members of the 24th Dáil
Members of the 25th Dáil
Members of the 26th Dáil
Members of the 27th Dáil
Members of the 28th Dáil
Members of the 29th Dáil
Members of the 30th Dáil
Members of the 31st Dáil
Ministers for Education (Ireland)
Ministers for Finance (Ireland)
Ministers of State of the 24th Dáil
People educated at Blackrock College
People educated at St Michael's College, Dublin
Nominated members of Seanad Éireann
Labour Party (Ireland) senators
People from Sandymount
Ministers for Enterprise, Trade and Employment